Rade Jovanović may refer to:

 Radovan Jovanović (1904–1941), Serbian partisan, national hero of Yugoslavia
 Rade Jovanović (composer) (1928–1986), Bosnian collector and composer of folk music
 Rade Jovanović (singer) (born 1971), Serbian singer and poet
 Rade Jovanović (basketball), Serbian basketball player who played for Red Star Belgrade during 1940s.